Megalosphecia callosoma is a moth of the family Sesiidae. It is known from Zambia.

References

Endemic fauna of Zambia
Sesiidae
Fauna of Zambia
Moths of Africa